Gangs of Wasseypur – Part 1 is a 2012 Indian Hindi-language crime film directed by Anurag Kashyap, and written by Kashyap and Zeishan Quadri. It is the first installment of the Gangs of Wasseypur series, centered on the coal mafia of Dhanbad, and the underlying power struggles, politics and vengeance between three crime families from 1941 to the mid-1990s. Part 1 stars an ensemble cast, featuring Manoj Bajpayee, Richa Chadda, Reema Sen, Piyush Mishra, Nawazuddin Siddiqui, Vineet Kumar Singh, Pankaj Tripathi, Huma Qureshi, Anurita Jha and Tigmanshu Dhulia.

Although both parts were shot as a single film measuring a total of 319 minutes, no Indian theatre would screen a five-hour film, so it was divided into two parts. Gangs of Wasseypur was screened in its entirety at the 2012 Cannes Directors' Fortnight, marking one of the only Hindi-language films to achieve this. It was also screened at the Sundance Film Festival in January 2013. It was filmed in Varanasi, Bihar, and Chunar, with these settings inspiring the film's soundtrack, which consists mainly of Indian folk.

The film was theatrically released on 22 June 2012, but was banned in Kuwait and Qatar for violent content. Upon release, Gangs of Wasseypur – Part 1 received critical acclaim, and won a number of awards. It received nominations for Best Film and Best Director for Kashyap at the 55th Asia-Pacific Film Festival, and won for Best Audiography at the 60th National Film Awards, while Siddiqui won a Special Mention for acting at the same ceremony. Gangs of Wasseypur – Part 1 also won four Filmfare Awards, including the Critics Award for Best Film, while Chadda won the Critics Award for Best Actress, at the 58th Filmfare Awards.

Although not an individual financial success, it is a combined gross of ₹50.81 crore that facilitated a modest commercial return due to its certificate

Plot

Prologue
In January 2004, a gang of heavily armed men scour and finally narrow down on a house in Wasseypur. They surround the house and unleash a wave of bullets and grenades on it with the intention of killing the family inside it. After heavy firing on the house, they retreat from the crime scene in a vehicle, convinced they have killed everyone within. The leader (Pankaj Tripathi) informs minister J.P. Singh (Satya Anand) that the family has been successfully executed but he is double crossed by JP as a firefight erupts between them and a police check post blocking their escape route. The scene cuts abruptly for a prologue by the narrator, Nasir (Piyush Mishra). The whole scene is then revealed in the sequel.

Introduction of Wasseypur and Dhanbad 
Nasir's narration describes the history and nature of Wasseypur. During the British Raj, Wasseypur and Dhanbad were located in the Bengal region. After India gained independence in 1947, they were carved out of Bengal and redistricted into the state of Bihar in 1956. In 2000, Wasseypur and Dhanbad were redistricted for a second time into the newly formed state of Jharkhand where they remain. The village has been historically dominated by the Qureshi Muslims, a sub-caste of animal butchers who are feared by the non-Qureshi Muslims living there and Dhanbad by extension.

During British colonial rule, the British had seized the farm lands of Dhanbad for coal which began the business of coal mining in Dhanbad. The region was the domain of the faceless dacoit Sultana Qureshi who robbed British trains in the night and thus held some patriotic value for the locals.

1940s 
In 1941, Shahid Khan (Jaideep Ahlawat), a Pathan, takes advantage of the mysteriousness of the faceless dacoit, Sultana, a Qureshi, by impersonating his identity to rob British ferry trains. The Qureshi clans eventually find out and order the banishment of Shahid and his family from Wasseypur. They settle down in Dhanbad where Shahid begins work as a labourer in a coal mine. He is unable to be at his wife's side during childbirth, and she dies. The enraged Shahid kills the coal mine's muscleman who had denied him leave on that day.

In 1947, independent India begins to assert its authority over itself. The British coal mines are sold to Indian industrialists and Ramadhir Singh (Rajat Bhagat) receives a few coal mines in the Dhanbad region. He hires Shahid as the new muscleman of one of the coal mines. Shahid terrorises the local population to seize their lands and extract compliance.

On a rainy day, Ramadhir overhears Shahid's ambitions of taking over the coal mines from him. Ramadhir tricks Shahid into traveling to Varanasi for business but instead has him murdered by an assassin named Yadav (Harish Khanna). Nasir (Piyush Mishra), Shahid's servant, finds Ramadhir's umbrella with his initials near the door and concludes that Ramadhir eavesdropped on their conversation. He flees from the house with Shahid's son Sardar just as Ehsaan Qureshi (Vipin Sharma), another associate of Ramadhir and a member of the Wasseypur Qureshi clan, shows up to kill them. An unsuccessful Ehsaan lies to Ramadhir that Shahid's family has been murdered, burnt, and buried. Under the care of Nasir, Sardar grows up along with Nasir's nephew Asgar . Sardar learns the truth about his father's death, upon which he shaves his head and vows not to grow his hair until he has avenged his father's murder.

1950s and 1960s 
In 1952, Jagjivan Ram is appointed as India's first Labour Minister. He starts the Coal Welfare Association in 1954 and in 1960, the National Trade Union which allowed mine supervisors to pressurise mine owners, the movement of which is led by a much older Ramadhir (Tigmanshu Dhulia). In 1962, the Trade Union becomes the mafia and begins extortion in exchange for union membership. Union workers start lending money and keep the workers' income as interest. In 1965, Ramadhir enters politics, wins the election and becomes the local workers' leader.

Early and mid-1970s 
In 1972, the coal mines are nationalised. A mature Sardar (Manoj Bajpai), Nasir (Piyush Mishra) and Asgar (Jameel Khan) start hijacking Ramadhir's coal trucks mid-transit. Ramadhir suspects S.P. Sinha (Pravin Singh Sisodia), a Coal India official, to be behind the hijackings and has him murdered. After Sinha's murder, Ramadhir's reputation for ruthlessness grows, and he becomes feared in Dhanbad.

Sardar marries Nagma Khatoon (Richa Chadda). The pregnant Nagma confronts Sardar and a prostitute inside a brothel and chases him away. Later, Nagma gives birth to Danish but gets pregnant soon afterwards. Unable to have sex with a pregnant Nagma, Sardar confesses his sexual frustrations with his kin. At dinner, Nagma gives her consent to Sardar to sleep with other women but with the condition that he won't bring them home or dishonour the family name.

Sardar, Asgar and Nasir start working for J.P., Ramadhir's son. They misuse their employment by secretly selling the company petrol in the black market. Later, they rob a petrol pump and a train bogie belonging to the Singh family. They usurp Ramadhir's land, which forces the two families to confront each other for talks. The meeting ends in a scuffle, but Ramadhir realizes that Sardar is the son of Shahid who he had murdered in 1947. Sardar and Asgar are jailed for assaulting J.P. during the meeting.

Late 1970s and early 1980s 
In 1979, Sardar and Asgar escape from jail. While hiding in Wasseypur at the home of Qamar Makhdoomi (Sanjeeva Vats), Sardar marries a woman named Durga (Reema Sen) working as a cook for Makhdoomi. Asgar informs Nagma that Sardar has taken a second wife, leaving Nagma helpless.

Meanwhile, in the '80s, Wasseypur has merged with Dhanbad and the Qureshi clan, now led by Sultan Qureshi (Pankaj Tripathi), a nephew of Sultana raised by his uncle Ehsaan, continues to terrorise the non-Qureshi Muslims and rape their women. Makhdoomi then asks Sultan for a peaceful negotiation but gets mocked. He then approaches Sardar for help, telling him about a house he'd bought which was now being used by Sultan's men as a hangout for gambling, drinking and raping kidnapped women. Sardar manages to get back to the house, moving his family there. He also kills J.P.'s muscle man, making him feared. During Muharram, both Shias and Sunnis are out mourning, including the Qureshi clan, and Sardar uses the opportunity to launch a major bomb attack on many Qureshi shops and houses, angering Sultan. When word spreads about Sardar's raids, his reputation grows and he commands more fear than the Qureshi clan.

Eventually, Sardar returns home to Nagma and she gets pregnant again. Sardar tries to initiate sex with a pregnant Nagma but she refuses, which prompts an angry Sardar to leave. He goes to stay with his second wife, Durga, and she gives birth to his son, Definite. Ramadhir, noticing that Sardar has abandoned his first family, tries to reach out to Nagma through Danish by giving him money. An enraged Nagma beats Danish for taking the money while she breaks down in front of Nasir. A thirsty Faizal (Danish's younger brother) wakes up in the middle of the night to find Nagma and Nasir about to have sex. Angry, he storms out of the house and becomes a stoner, permanently seen with his chillum. Nasir reveals that the desires were never consummated, but Faizal and Nasir can never look at each other in the eye again.

Mid- and late 1980s 
In 1985, a Wasseypur girl, Sabrina Khan, is abducted by four drunk men at night. Sardar threatens Ramadhir's family in order to retrieve the girl, so Ramadhir sends J.P. to complete the task. J.P. finds the girl and kills two of the kidnappers. Sardar and Asgar track down the other kidnappers; Asgar chops up one of them into pieces while Sardar makes Mohsin, the survivor watch. He then forces Mohsin to divorce his first wife and marry Sabrina. Sensing Sardar's increasing clout, Ramadhir calls Ehsaan who brokers a meeting between Sultan and Ramadhir where the two decide to become allies against their common enemy, Sardar. Sultan asks Ramadhir for modern automatic weapons which the latter promises to give.

By 1989, coal theft has become a common, petty crime and the big money has moved to fraudulent contracts for logging hollow mines and filling up defunct mines.

1990s 
In 1990, Sardar quits coal and starts stealing sand off the riverbank. He gets the contract to fill the defunct mines in Nasir's name. He becomes the most feared man in Wasseypur, pushing the Qureishis out of Wasseypur and shifts his business to stealing iron ore. Coal becomes a mere chapter in the Dhanbad mafia. A mature Danish (Vineet Kumar Singh) joins the family business. A failed attack from Sultan leaves Danish with a minor injury and causes reconciliation between Sardar and Nagma. Sardar finds Ramadhir and warns him of terrible consequences if anything ever happens to his family.

A mature Faizal (Nawazuddin Siddiqui) is seriously affected by Bollywood movies as he starts behaving, talking and dressing like Bollywood characters. Sardar sends Faizal to Varanasi to buy guns, but Faizal is caught by the police and jailed. Upon release, he kills the gun seller Yadav, unknowingly avenging his grandfather's murder. An uneasy peace is maintained between the Qureshi and Khan families when Danish convinces Badoor Qureshi, uncle of Sultan, to stop the war and marries Shama Parveen (Anurita Jha), Sultan's cousin. Sultan detests the marriage and tries to prevent it to no avail. At the same time, Faizal begins romancing Mohsina Hamid (Huma Qureshi), another kin of Sultan.

Epilogue 
Faizal reveals to his friend, Fazlu (Sanjay Singh) that his father would be travelling without security the next day. Fazlu, who works for Sultan, calls up the Qureshis and tells them that Sardar's bodyguards wouldn't be with him the next day. The next morning, Sardar leaves home alone and reaches Durga's house where he gives her expense allowance. Once Sardar leaves, Durga also calls up the Qureshis and tells them that he has just left her house. The Qureshi men follow Sardar's car, and, when the latter stops at a petrol pump to refuel, they start shooting as Sardar ducks in the car for cover. The Qureshi men put several close rounds through the car window ensuring a precise and unmistakable hit, after which they escape. A shocked Sardar opens the car door and stands up to reveal multiple bullet wounds, with one bullet embedded in his head. He steps out with his gun drawn to stop a cycle ferry on which he eventually collapses to his death.

Sequel

Cast 
 Manoj Bajpayee as Sardar Khan
 Richa Chadda as Nagma Khatoon Khan: Sardar's first wife; Danish, Faizal and Perpendicular's mother; Shama and Mohsina's mother in law.
 Reema Sen as Durga Khan: Sardar's second wife; Definite's mother; Danish, Faizal and Perpendicular's stepmother.
 Piyush Mishra as Nasir Ahmed
 Nawazuddin Siddiqui as Faizal Khan: Sardar and Nagma's second son; Danish and Perpendicular's brother; Definite's stepbrother; Mohsina's husband.
 Jaideep Ahlawat as Shahid Khan: Sardar's father; Nagma and Durga's father in law; Danish, Faizal, Perpendicular and Definite's grandfather; Shama and Mohsina's grandfather in law.
 Vineet Kumar Singh as Danish Khan: Sardar and Nagma's first son; Faizal and Perpendicular's elder brother;
 Pankaj Tripathi as Sultan Qureshi
 Vipin Sharma as Ehsan Qureshi
 Jameel Khan as Asgar Khan
 Satya Anand as J P Singh
 Pramod Pathak as Sharif Qureshi a.k.a. Sultana Daku / Badoor Qureshi
 Huma Qureshi as Mohsina Hamid Khan: Faizal's wife; Sardar and Nagma's daughter in law; Danish, Perpendicular and Definite's sister in law 
 Anurita Jha as Shama Parveen Khan: Danish's wife; Sardar and Nagma's daughter in law; Faizal, Perpendicular and Definite's sister in law
 Tigmanshu Dhulia as Ramadhir Singh
 Rajat Bhagat as Young Ramadhir Singh
 Yashpal Sharma as Occasional Singer (guest appearance)
 Vicky Kaushal as silhouette bystander (Cameo Role)

Production

Development 
Anurag Kashyap said he had wanted to make a film on Bihar with the name Bihar for some time but for various reasons it didn't take off. In 2008 he met Zeishan Quadri (the writer of Gangs of Wasseypur) who told him about Wasseypur's story. He found it unreal to believe that mafia activity and gang war existed at such a high level. Zeishan narrated enough stories but what really attracted him was not gang war but the entire story of the emergence of the mafia. According to him to tell the story through a few families is what interested him but that also meant a longer reel. "We all know mafia exists but what they do, how they operate, why they do we don't know and that is something which forms the basis of the film".

Casting 
According to Bajpayee, the role of Sardar Khan is the most negative role he has done till date. His motivation for doing this role came from the fact that there was "something new" with the character of Sardar Khan. Piyush Mishra and Tigmanshu Dhulia were given the discretion to decide who, among them, would perform the roles of Nasir and Ramadhir. Mishra chose the role of Nasir and Dhulia portrayed Ramadhir Singh. Chadda revealed in an interview that this role helped her bag 11 film roles. This was Huma Qureshi's first film, and she characterised this as her "dream debut". Qureshi landed this role after director Anurag Kashyap spotted her in a Samsung commercial he was directing.

Filming 
During filming in Varanasi in December 2010, film's chief assistant director Sohil Shah died while performing one of the stunt shot scenes. The movie was dedicated to Sohil Shah, as is seen in the opening titles. The film finished production in late March 2011, with Anurag Kashyap moving on to direct his next film immediately due to the accident.

Major portions of the film were shot at villages near Bihar. Shooting also took place in Chunar.

Anurag Kashyap, who co-produced the film with Sunil Bohra, has said that it is his most expensive film and he reportedly had to spend  15 crore on paying the actors. Both parts of Gangs of Wasseypur together cost just ₹18.4 crore to make. Anurag Kashyap, the director of film tweeted – "450 million as reported in the media is false."

Themes and portrayals

Style 
The filming style adopted by Anurag Kashyap in Gangs of Wasseypur bears a striking similarity to the styles of Sam Peckinpah. The scenes are short in length, several in number and often a series of montages take the story forward. Anurag Kashyap never has to resort to extraneous elements like stylised entries, editing patterns or camera motions to add to the effect because the story has an intrinsic impact of its own. However the film doesn't fall short of any technical finesse. There's unabashed blood, gore and abuse wherever the scene demands.

Lines like "Tum sahi ho, woh marad hai," ("You are right, he is male") said in resigned agreement to a wronged wife stand out for their cruel truths of rural life. Kashyap's use of occasional bursts of music and comedy to punctuate the slowly augmenting tension at different junctures is highly reminiscent of Spaghetti Westerns. Kashyap's use of dark humour to judiciously propagate violence bears an uncanny similarity to Quentin Tarantino's style of movie-making. Absorbing styles as diverse as those of old-school Italo-American mafia classics a la Coppola, Scorsese and Leone, as well as David Michod's taut crime thriller "Animal Kingdom," Kashyap never lets his influences override the distinct Indian color. The pacing is machine-gun relentless, sweeping incoherence and repetitiveness under the carpet as it barrels forward with hypnotic speed.

Theme 

The movie chronicles the journey of the saga associated with coal mines. It portrays the gang lords of Wasseypur like Shafi Khan, Faheem Khan and Shabir Alam. The film has also been inspired from the story of rivals Shafi Khan and Surya Dev Singh. Rajeev Masand of CNN-IBN calls the movie, a gang warfare and notes that "On the surface, Gangs of Wasseypur is a revenge saga, a tableau of vengeance between generations of gangsters. Scratch that surface and you'll discover more than just a grim portrait".
While some of the critics noted that the film, is a powerful political film, which underlines the party politics system (at that time) allowing the growth of illegal coal trading and mafias in the region (Bihar) and their use as a political tool, thus making the allotment of coal blocks, one of the most powerful expressions of controlling power in the region. Despite its grim theme, the film also has an inherent sense of humour that comes quite naturally to it from its series of events. The scene where Reema Sen is charmed by Manoj Bajpai over her daily chores or the one where Nawazuddin goes on a formal date with Huma Qureshi are outrageously hilarious.
The household politics is one of the many subplots rendering layers to the story. You realise Sardar's family is emerging into a Corleone set-up of sorts. His sons - the brooding Danish and the doped-out Faizal (Nawazuddin Siddiqui) from Nagma, and the enigmatic Definite Khan (Zeishan Quadri) from Durga - will become key players in this revenge story. Violent as his screenplay is, Kashyap reveals wit while narrating his tale. Ample black comedy is used to imagine the gang war milieu. The humour lets us relate to the intrinsic irreverent nature of men who live by the gun. Character development can best justify the length of Part 1.

Music 

The soundtrack album of the two-part compilation of Gangs of Wasseypur has 27 songs, composed by Sneha Khanwalkar and Piyush Mishra, with lyrics by Mishra and Varun Grover. However, the album was split up according to the film's release. Part 1 has 14 songs which were released on 23 May 2012. The film's soundtrack is heavily influenced by traditional Indian folk songs. The film score is composed by noted Tamil composer G. V. Prakash Kumar.

The audio launch of this film took place in a unique way at a road show event, held in the streets of Mumbai, where Manoj Bajpayee, Huma Qureshi and Anurag Kashyap, had driven a jeep around the suburbs and the team danced on the streets wearing red gamuchas and has been making public appearances in them ever since.

Raja Sen of Rediff gave a 5 star rating to the soundtrack calling it a "A strikingly flavourful and headily authentic collection of quirky music". Purva Desai of Times of India said "The music is brilliant and this album deserves all the praises." Shivi Reflections of Koimoi in her favourable review wrote that "Gangs of Wasseypur is a soundtrack which should be acknowledged for its experimentation and uniqueness." Joginder Tuteja of Bollywood Hungama rated 2 out of 5, stating that "Despite it being song-heavy, it doesn't quite boast of tracks that have a long lasting appeal."

Sneha Khanwalkar had been nominated for various awards for the music of the 2 parts, including the prestigious Best Music Director award at the 58th Filmfare Awards.

Marketing 

The marketing of Gangs of Wasseypur was noted for its uniqueness. Gamchha, a thin traditional East Indian towel was taken to Cannes, the Gangs of Wasseypur team danced on the streets wearing red gamchhas, after the Cannes Film Festival and has been making public appearances in them ever since. While most music launches in India happen with a big party in a 5-star banquet hall in Delhi or Mumbai, and formal announcements before the press, the music of this film, was launched in Patna.

In another effective way of building the world of Wasseypur for the audience, a fictitious newspaper was made available online which was named Wasseypur Patrika.

In keeping with the language and setup of the film, wall paintings instead of posters, reading Goli Nahi Marenge, Keh Ke Lenge – Gangs of Wasseypur were painted on walls across 20 cities.

Gangs of Wasseypur mementos — The Gangs of Wasseypur team has made a memento consisting of bullets of a different era. While all sorts of weapons have been used in the film, this is the best thing one could give as a memento.

Reception

Critical reception 
India

Bikas Bhagat of Zee News gave the movie 4 stars out of 5, concluding that "So if you want to experience an all new wave of cinema in Bollywood, Gangs of Wasseypur is your movie. It has some really quirky moments which I'll leave for you to explore in the film. Watch it for its sheer cinematic pleasure!"

Subhash K. Jha of IANS gave the movie 4 out of 5 stars, saying that "Brutal, brilliant, dark, sinister, terrifying in its violence and yet savagely funny in the way human life is disregarded Gangs of Wasseypur is one helluva romp into the raw and rugged heartland. Not to be missed." Taran Adarsh of Bollywood Hungama gave the movie 3.5 stars out of 5, saying that "On the whole, Gangs of Wasseypur symbolizes the fearless new Indian cinema that shatters the clichés and conventional formulas, something which Anurag Kashyap has come to be acknowledged for. It has all the trappings of an entertainer, but with a difference. The film prides itself with the substance that connects with enthusiasts of new-age cinema. But, I wish to restate, one needs to have a really strong belly to soak up to a film like Gangs of Wasseypur. Also, this striking movie-watching experience comes with a colossal length and duration. The reactions, therefore, would be in extremes. Gangs of Wasseypur is for that segment of spectators who seek pleasure in watching forceful, hard-hitting and gritty movies."

Rajeev Masand of CNN-IBN gave the movie 3.5 stars out of 5, concluding that "Bolstered by its riveting performances and its thrilling plot dynamics, this is a gripping film that seizes your full attention. I'm going with three-and-a-half out of five for Anurag Kashyap's Gangs of Wasseypur. Despite its occasionally indulgent narrative, this bullet-ridden saga is worthy of a repeat viewing, if only to catch all its nuances. Don't miss it." Mansha Rastogi of Now Running gave the movie 3.5 stars out of 5, commenting that "Gangs of Wasseypur works like an explosive leaving you wanting for more. Gangs of Wasseypur – Part 2 will definitely be a film eagerly awaited! Devour part one in the meantime!"

Madhureeta Mukherjee of Times of India gave the movie 3.5 stars out of 5, saying that "Director Anurag Kashyap, in his trademark style of story- telling – realistic, with strong characters, over-the-top sequences, and unadulterated local flavour (crude maa-behen gaalis galore), gruesome bloody violence and raw humour – interestingly spins this twisted tale. This first of a two-part film, is ambitious indeed; showing promise of brilliance in parts, but not bullet-proof to flaws. With a runtime this long, meandering side tracks and random sub-plots, countless characters, documentary-style narrative backed with black and white montages from actual history, it loses blood in the second half because of the Director's over-(self)indulgence. So, hold on to your guns, gamchas and 'womaniyas'."

Saibal Chatterjee of NDTV gave the movie 3.5 stars out of 5, concluding that "It may not be for the faint-hearted and the prissy. Gangs of Wasseypur is a heavyweight knockout punch. You're down for the count!" Blessy Chettiar of DNA gave the movie 3.5 stars out of 5, commenting that "Even though there's so much going for Part 1, there's something always amiss, something that leaves you underwhelmed after all those expectations. May be its a hope of a dashing Part 2. Let's wait and watch."

Kunal Guha of Yahoo! gave the movie 3 stars out of 5, concluding that "Considering the amount of blood spilled in this film, it could’ve just been called 'Gangs of Sauce-e-pur'. Hot and sweet and different. 'Bata deejiyega sabko!’" Roshni Devi of Koimoi gave the movie 3 stars out of 5, saying that "Gangs of Wasseypur is a very good movie that gets bogged down by the endless characters and length of the movie. If you love those hinterland mafia movies, this is definitely for you."

On the contrary, Raja Sen of Rediff gave the movie 2.5 stars out of 5, concluding that "It is the excess that suffocates all the magic, originality dying out for lack of room to breathe. Kashyap gets flavour, setting and character right, but the lack of economy cripples the film. There is a lot of gunfire, but like the fine actors populating its sets, Wasseypur fires too many blanks."

Mayank Shekhar of theW14.com said, "Most movies have a definite beginning (starting point), middle (turning point) and end (high point), or what playwrights call the three-act structure in a script. There doesn't seem to be one here, at least on the face of it. The genre it comes closest to then is an epic, spelt with a capital E, along the lines of saying Francis Ford Coppola's Godfather trilogy, or this film's immediate inspiration Martin Scorsese's Gangs of New York (2002). And, of course, it is like all mythologies are supposed to be. You enjoy them for the parts rather than caring merely for the hero's final goal. If it wasn't a film, this would’ve been a stylised graphic novel. But you would’ve missed a memorable background score and striking sound design."

International
The film met positive international reviews. Deborah Young of The Hollywood Reporter called the film "an extraordinary ride through Bollywood's spectacular, over-the-top filmmaking". Referring to the violence and pace of the film she says "Gangs of Wasseypur puts Tarantino in a corner with its cool command of cinematically inspired and referenced violence, ironic characters and breathless pace". Maggie Lee of Variety notes Kashyap never lets his diverse influences of old-school Italo-American mafia classics a la Coppola, Scorsese and Leone, as well as David Michod's taut crime thriller "Animal Kingdom," override the distinct Indian color. Calling the film "the love child of Bollywood and Hollywood," she felt the film was "by turns pulverizing and poetic in its depiction of violence." Lee Marshall of Screen International writes "the script alternates engagingly between scenes of sometimes stomach-churning violence and moments of domestic comedy, made more tasty by hard-boiled lines of dialogue like "in Wasseypur even the pigeons fly with one wing, because they need the other to cover their arse". He describes song lyrics "as if mouthed by a Greek chorus of street punks" commenting sarcastically on what's happening onscreen.

Box office 
Gangs of Wasseypur collected ₹12.25 crore in the first four days. Gangs of Wasseypur collected ₹10 crore net approx over its first weekend. The collections were good all over. Both instalments of the film were made at a production cost of ₹18.5 crore and with ₹17.5 crore as the total first week collection of the first part, film has successfully recovered the total production cost minus promotion cost. Gangs of Wasseypur held up week two but with low collections. The second week was around  7 crore nett. Gangs of Wasseypur – Part 1 has earned ₹27.52 crore in India, as of 27 July 2012 and the film is declared "Below Average" at box-office.

The success party for the film was held at Escobar in Bandra, Mumbai on Thursday, 5 July, late evening.

Differences from actual events 
The film mainly draws its story from the real life gang wars that took place in the region of Dhanbad, Jharkhand. There are several differences in the film which contradict actual documented events most notably the character of Faizal Khan (based on Faheem Khan) who dies in the climax. Faheem Khan is currently in jail in Hazaribagh and has been sentenced to life imprisonment. In the film, Sardar Khan marries the Bengali girl but in real life, the woman was maintained as a keep. Most of the gang wars were between the gangs of Wasseypur, not with the Singhs, who had been instrumental in instigating these wars, but never participated in them. There was no character akin to Shahid Khan.

Another scene in the movie, where a Muslim girl is kidnapped by Singh's men, has been portrayed conversely. In real life, the victim was a local Hindu girl and the kidnappers were a few goons from Wasseypur. The members of the Singh family ultimately had to threaten the entire Wasseypur community to return the girl in 24 hours. The girl was eventually returned as the Singhs were regarded in the village with might and fear.

The character of Ramadhir Singh is based on Surajdeo Singh. In the film's climax, Singh is brutally killed by Faizal but in real life, Singh died of natural causes in June 1991.

Fazloo's character is based on Sabir Alam. In the film, Fazloo is killed and dismembered by Faizal Khan. In real life, Sabir Alam and Faheem Khan were childhood friends turned enemies. Sabir was awarded a life sentence in 2007 for the murder of Faheem Khan's mother and aunt, is out on bail in Wasseypur.

The mafia's downfall in Dhanbad didn't come from gang wars but rather it came from the differences between Kunti Singh, the widow of Surajdeo Singh, and his three brothers – Baccha Singh, Rajan Singh and Ram Dhani Singh – which gave others an opportunity to make space for themselves.

References

External links 

2012 films
Indian films about revenge
2010s Hindi-language films
Indian crime drama films
Indian action drama films
Films set in the 1940s
Films set in the 1950s
Films set in the 1960s
Films set in the 1970s
Films set in the 1980s
Films set in the 1990s
2012 action drama films
2012 crime drama films
Indian crime thriller films
Indian gangster films
Indian crime action films
Indian epic films
Films set in Bihar
Films set in Jharkhand
Films set in Uttar Pradesh
Films set in West Bengal
Films about organised crime in India
Films about corruption in India
Films set in the British Empire
Films set in the Indian independence movement
Films directed by Anurag Kashyap
Crime in Jharkhand
Films shot in Bihar
Films scored by Sneha Khanwalkar
Films that won the Best Audiography National Film Award
Viacom18 Studios films
Films with screenplays by Anurag Kashyap
2012 crime action films
Films set in Dhanbad
Indian black comedy films